Panda Express is an American fast food restaurant chain that specializes in American Chinese cuisine. With over 2,200 locations, it is the largest Asian-segment restaurant chain in the United States, where it was founded, and is mainly located in North America and Asia (in addition to other countries and territories). Panda Express restaurants were traditionally located in shopping mall food courts, but the chain now operates units in many other environments and formats, including stand-alone restaurants, as well as universities, casinos, airports, military bases, amusement parks and other venues.

The chain offers a variety of Chinese cuisine–inspired dishes that has been largely Americanized, including orange chicken, sweet fire chicken breast, Beijing beef, grilled teriyaki chicken, and Kung Pao chicken, with certain premium dishes such as honey walnut shrimp and black pepper Angus steak having additional costs for the patron. The company is headquartered in Rosemead, California. The Panda Express brand is a casual, fast-food variation of corporate sibling Panda Inn, which is a chain of upscale, table service restaurants.

History 

The Panda Restaurant Group, parent company of Panda Inn, Panda Express, and Hibachi-San, was founded by Andrew Cherng, Peggy Cherng and Andrew's father, Master Chef Ming Tsai Cherng.  Andrew Cherng and his father are Chinese born, while Peggy was born in Burma and raised in Hong Kong. Both Andrew and Peggy Cherng are alumni of Baker University in Baldwin City, Kansas (where they first met).

Andrew went into business with his father in the United States in 1973, opening their first Panda Inn restaurant in Pasadena, California. At the beginning, business was lacking to the degree that Andrew had to offer special deals and freebies so that customers would dine at Panda Inn. In 1982, Peggy joined Andrew in the restaurant business.  While operating Panda Inn, Andrew became acquainted with then-UCLA head football coach Terry Donahue, as well as Terry's brother Dan, who happened to be in the real estate business.  It was because of this connection that in 1983, Donahue Schriber Real Estate, the manager of the Glendale Galleria, invited the Cherngs to develop a fast-food version of Panda Inn for the Galleria's food court, and Panda Express was launched that October. A second location was opened two years later at the Westside Pavilion in 1985. The chain has steadily expanded across the United States since then. Chef Andy Kao claims to have developed the original Chinese-American orange chicken recipe at a Panda Express in Hawaii in 1987.

At first, Panda Express restaurants were found solely in food courts in major shopping malls.  During the late 1980s and early 1990s, the Cherngs began experimenting with supermarket-based branches, through a deal with Vons, and then stand-alone restaurant locations.  In 1997, the company opened its first stand-alone, drive-through restaurant, in Hesperia, California.  Today less than 2% of its restaurants are in malls.

Because Peggy had worked for several years as a software designer and engineer for defense contractors like McDonnell Douglas, Panda Express computerized its operations early on.  Peggy also brought a systems analysis perspective to the business and worked through the logistics and standardization issues necessary to scale up the concept.

In 2005, Panda Express began to open units in food courts on college campus, some of which participate in the residential student meal plans. In 2008, the Cherngs were the recipients of the City of Angels Award, given by the LAX Coastal Area Chamber of Commerce, for their contributions to the greater Los Angeles area. As of 2007, the company's highest revenue location, bringing in over US$4 million annually, was located at the Ala Moana Center food court in Honolulu, Hawaii. On November 23, 2009, it was announced that Panda Express had selected Trusonic to provide Asian themed background music to its store locations.

On the ABC News TV program Nightline, April 18, 2011, there was a feature segment on Panda Express and its success. The segment described how Andrew Cherng encourages his workers and management to go through self-help programs emphasizing Landmark Education.

In 2011, a suit was filed by the Equal Employment Opportunity Commission against Panda Express because it was reportedly treating its Hispanic employees differently than Asian employees. In June 2013, it was announced that the restaurant chain will pay $150,000 to settle another EEOC action on behalf of at least three female teenagers who were allegedly sexually harassed between 2007 and 2009 by one male kitchen supervisor in Kauai, Hawaii. In addition to the fines, Panda Express revised its policies and was required to provide anti-discrimination and sexual harassment training for employees.

Later that year, Panda Express opened its first location in the western Pacific by opening a location in the American territory of Guam. The first location in the state of Alaska was later opened in December 2015.

As of 2017, the Panda Restaurant Group had annual sales of over $3 billion and close to 39,000 employees. The Cherngs also opened Panda Innovation Kitchen in Pasadena with their daughter, Andrea Cherng, overlooking a majority of the restaurant's business. The idea for Panda Innovation Kitchen is to experiment with new flavours and ingredients to come up with new menu items. In addition, they also opened a tea bar to introduce Taiwanese drinks such as boba milk tea and new drinks like the Fortune Cookie Shake.

In December 2017, Panda Express had opened the chain's 2,000th location, which is located in New York City near Columbia University.

In February of 2022, Panda Restaurant Group filed a U.S. trademark application for the name PANDAVERSE for “downloadable virtual goods, namely, food items and beverages for use in virtual worlds" and "virtual food and beverage products.” The filing marked an intention to expand the Panda Express brand into the Metaverse.

International 
Panda Express also operates in Canada, Saudi Arabia, Guatemala, Japan, Mexico, El Salvador, Philippines, South Korea and the United Arab Emirates. The first location in Mexico opened in Mexico City in September 2011.

In October 2013, the first Panda Express located in Canada opened on Hunt Club Road in Nepean, Ontario but has since closed. The first location in Calgary was opened in October 2016.

On May 26, 2014, it was reported by Arabian Business news that Panda Express would be opening a restaurant in the United Arab Emirates. The first Panda Express restaurant in the Middle East was open in Dubai in November 2014.

The first location in South Korea was opened in Seoul in September 2014 as a joint venture with Seoul-based SF Innovation Co.

In July 2016, Panda Express opened its first location in Guatemala, in Guatemala City.

In September 2017, Panda Express opened its first location on the Dutch Caribbean country of Aruba at the Queen Beatrix International Airport.

Although it's unknown when Panda Express had opened its first restaurant in Saudi Arabia, a second Panda Express in Saudi Arabia opened in Riyadh in January 2018. Both Saudi Arabian restaurants, as well as the ones in United Arab Emirates are operated by Gourmet Gulf.

In July 2018, Panda Express entered El Salvador for the first time by opening 2 locations in the capital city of San Salvador

In September 2018, Panda Express announced its joint venture with Jollibee Foods Corporation to bring its stores in the Philippines. A year later, in December 2019, the first Panda Express restaurant in the Philippines opened at SM Megamall in Mandaluyong. This was followed by a branch in SM City North EDSA in Quezon City in 2021. As of February 2023, it now has twelve operational branches in the Philippines, all located in the Greater Manila Area.

The first Panda Express in Russia opened in Moscow in September 2018. However, in March 2022, Panda Express has ceased all corporate support, including operations, marketing, and supply chain in response to the Russian war against Ukraine.

Panda Express previously had eight sites in Japan that were operated under a franchise agreement that later lapsed. In November 2016, the company returned to the country by opening a new restaurant in Kawasaki. This restaurant is operated as part of a joint partnership with Ippudo. As of August 2022, were nine restaurants in the country.

In October 2020, the South China Morning Post reported that a fake Panda Express restaurant in the southwestern Chinese city of Kunming had been reported for trademark infringement, and was closed during an investigation. The reportedly fake restaurant used the same Panda Express logo, and its menu reportedly included the same Kung Pao Chicken and Tangerine Peel Chicken as the company's restaurants.

In August 2022, Panda Express opened its first European site in Kaiserslautern Military Community Center food court, Ramstein Air Base, Germany.

Philanthropy
In 1999, Panda Express launched Panda Cares to give back to the community. They provide funding, food and volunteer services to children in need and disaster relief efforts. The company installed donation boxes in all the Panda Express restaurants in 2010. The charity has raised $107 million, with $89 million coming from in-store donation boxes, and $41 million has been donated to "The Leader In Me", a program to teach leadership and life skills that has been rolled out to 865 elementary schools in 39 states. The organization has also donated $37 million to Children's Miracle Network Hospitals, to support medical costs for poor children, and also supports disaster relief efforts.

See also
 List of Chinese restaurants

References

Further reading 

 
 
 - Asia Society, Southern California.
 Andrew Cherng interview, The Tavis Smiley Show, original airdate November 14, 2006.
 Jennings, Lisa, "Having words with Peggy Tsiang Cherng: chief executive and co-chair, Panda Restaurant Group", Nation's Restaurant News, August 1, 2005.
 "panda express feedback", @Mizzou, University of Missouri, Alumni Association magazine, January 2004.
 Panda Restaurant Group Corporate Data- from Panda Restaurant Group website
 
 Bernstein, Charles, 'Manchu Leads the Working Race,' Restaurants & Institutions, August 1, 1994, p. 30.
 Cebrzynski, Gregg, 'Panda Express Breaks TV Ad Campaign as Test to Raise Brand Awareness,' Nation's Restaurant News, August 9, 1999, p. 11.
 Farkas, David, 'Fast and Friendly,' Chain Leader, March 2000, p. 72.
 Glover, Kara, 'Success on Oriental (Food) Express,' Los Angeles Business Journal, September 25, 1995, p. 21.
 Krantz, Matt, "Panda Express Spreads Chinese Food Across USA", USA Today, September 11, 2006
 Marchetti, Michele, and Alisson, Lucas, 'Creating Panda-monium,' Sales & Marketing Management, January 1996, p. 14.
 Martin, Richard, 'Panda Express: Bullish about the Bear,' Nation's Restaurant News, May 16, 1994, p. 86.
 ------, 'Top Chi-Chi's, El Torito Execs Tackle Panda Push,' Nation's Restaurant News, August 7, 1995, p. 18

External links 

 
 Hoover's Financial Data on the Panda Restaurant Group

Chinese restaurants outside China
Fast-food chains of the United States
Restaurant chains in the United States
Restaurants in California
Companies based in Los Angeles County, California
Restaurants established in 1983
1983 establishments in California
Restaurants in Greater Los Angeles
Rosemead, California
Fast casual restaurants